The 1964 CFL season is considered to be the 11th season in modern-day Canadian football, although it is officially the seventh Canadian Football League season.

Regular season standings

Final regular season standings
Note: GP = Games Played, W = Wins, L = Losses, T = Ties, PF = Points For, PA = Points Against, Pts = Points

Bold text means that they have clinched the playoffs.
 BC and Hamilton have first round byes.

Grey Cup playoffs
Note: All dates in 1964

Conference Semi-Finals

Conference Finals

Playoff bracket

Grey Cup Championship

CFL Leaders
 CFL Passing Leaders
 CFL Rushing Leaders
 CFL Receiving Leaders

1964 CFL All-Stars

Offence
QB – Joe Kapp, BC Lions
RB – Lovell Coleman, Calgary Stampeders
RB – Dick Shatto, Toronto Argonauts
RB – Ed Buchanan, Saskatchewan Roughriders
TE – Tommy Joe Coffey, Edmonton Eskimos
TE – Hal Patterson, Hamilton Tiger-Cats
F – Tommy Grant, Hamilton Tiger-Cats
C – Chet Miksza, Hamilton Tiger-Cats
OG – Tony Pajaczkowski, Calgary Stampeders
OG – Ellison Kelly, Hamilton Tiger-Cats
OG – Al Benecick, Saskatchewan Roughriders
OT – Roger Kramer, Ottawa Rough Riders
OT – Lonnie Dennis, BC Lions

Defence
DT – John Barrow, Hamilton Tiger-Cats
DT – Mike Cacic, BC Lions
DE – Dick Fouts, BC Lions
DE – Peter Neumann, Hamilton Tiger-Cats
MG – Tom Brown, BC Lions
LB – Wayne Harris, Calgary Stampeders
LB – Ron Brewer, Toronto Argonauts
LB – Bobby Kuntz, Hamilton Tiger-Cats
DB – Garney Henley, Hamilton Tiger-Cats
DB – Don Sutherin, Hamilton Tiger-Cats
DB – Bill Munsey, BC Lions
DB – Jerry Keeling, Calgary Stampeders
DB – Bob Ptacek, Saskatchewan Roughriders

1964 Eastern All-Stars

Offence
QB – Bernie Faloney, Hamilton Tiger-Cats
RB – Ron Stewart, Ottawa Rough Riders
RB – Dick Shatto, Toronto Argonauts
RB – Dave Thelen, Ottawa Rough Riders
E – Ted Watkins, Ottawa Rough Riders
E – Hal Patterson, Hamilton Tiger-Cats
F – Tommy Grant, Hamilton Tiger-Cats
C – Chet Miksza, Hamilton Tiger-Cats
OG – Ed Harrington, Toronto Argonauts
OG – Ellison Kelly, Hamilton Tiger-Cats
OT – Roger Kramer, Ottawa Rough Riders
OT – Bronko Nagurski Jr., Hamilton Tiger-Cats

Defence
DT – Ted Elsby, Montreal Alouettes
DT – Billy Shipp, Toronto Argonauts
DE – Billy Joe Booth, Ottawa Rough Riders
DE – Peter Neumann, Hamilton Tiger-Cats
MG – John Barrow, Hamilton Tiger-Cats
LB – Ron Brewer, Toronto Argonauts
LB – Bobby Kuntz, Hamilton Tiger-Cats
DB – Garney Henley, Hamilton Tiger-Cats
DB – Don Sutherin, Hamilton Tiger-Cats
DB – Ed Learn, Montreal Alouettes
DB – Jim Rountree, Toronto Argonauts
DB – Joe Poirier, Ottawa Rough Riders

1964 Western All-Stars

Offence
QB – Joe Kapp, BC Lions
RB – Lovell Coleman, Calgary Stampeders
RB – Leo Lewis, Winnipeg Blue Bombers
RB – Ed Buchanan, Saskatchewan Roughriders
E – Tommy Joe Coffey, Edmonton Eskimos
E – Pete Manning, Calgary Stampeders
E – Pat Claridge, BC Lions
F – Hugh Campbell, Saskatchewan Roughriders
C – Neil Habig, Saskatchewan Roughriders
OG – Al Benecick, Saskatchewan Roughriders
OG – Tom Hinton, BC Lions
OT – Frank Rigney, Winnipeg Blue Bombers
OT – Lonnie Dennis, BC Lions

Defence
DT – Ron Atchison, Saskatchewan Roughriders
DT – Mike Cacic, BC Lions
DE – Dick Fouts, BC Lions
DE – Bill Whisler, Winnipeg Blue Bombers
MG – Tom Brown, BC Lions
LB – Wayne Harris, Calgary Stampeders
LB – Wayne Shaw, Saskatchewan Roughriders
DB – Dale West, Saskatchewan Roughriders
DB – Neal Beaumont, BC Lions
DB – Bill Munsey, BC Lions
DB – Jerry Keeling, Calgary Stampeders
DB – Bob Ptacek, Saskatchewan Roughriders

1964 CFL Awards
 CFL's Most Outstanding Player Award – Lovell Coleman (RB), Calgary Stampeders
 CFL's Most Outstanding Canadian Award – Tommy Grant (F), Hamilton Tiger-Cats
 CFL's Most Outstanding Lineman Award – Tom Brown (LB), BC Lions
 CFL's Coach of the Year – Ralph Sazio, Hamilton Tiger-Cats
 Jeff Russel Memorial Trophy (Eastern MVP) – Dick Shatto (RB), Toronto Argonauts
 Jeff Nicklin Memorial Trophy (Western MVP) - Tom Brown (LB), BC Lions
 Gruen Trophy (Eastern Rookie of the Year) - Al Irwin (WR), Montreal Alouettes
 Dr. Beattie Martin Trophy (Western Rookie of the Year) - Billy Cooper (WR), Winnipeg Blue Bombers
 DeMarco–Becket Memorial Trophy (Western Outstanding Lineman) - Tom Brown (MG), BC Lions

References 

Canadian Football League seasons
CFL